HMNZS Santon (M1178) was a  that operated in the Royal Navy, the Royal New Zealand Navy (RNZN), and the Argentine Navy. Built for the Royal Navy by Fleetlands Shipyard of Portsmouth, the minesweeper was launched on 18 August 1955 and commissioned as HMS Santon. She was named after a small village in North Lincolnshire. The minesweeper was commissioned in the RNZN from 1965 to 1966, when she was returned to the United Kingdom. She was later transferred to the Argentine Navy, and operated as ARA Chubut (M3).

Construction
Santon was built for the Royal Navy by Fleetlands Shipyards of Portsmouth. The minesweeper was launched on 18 August 1955.

Operational history

United Kingdom

New Zealand
Early in 1965, Indonesia was employing a policy of confrontation against Malaysia. New Zealand agreed to assist Malaysia by deploying two Royal Navy minesweepers then in reserve at Singapore. These were commissioned into the RNZN on 10 April 1965 and joined the Royal Navy's 11th Minesweeping squadron (also Ton class), taking part in anti-infiltration patrols in Malaysian waters. Lieutenant Lincoln Tempero, later Chief of Naval Staff, was appointed Commanding Officer. 

In her first year Santon, together with her sister ship , carried out 200 patrols, with 20 incidents involving intruding Indonesians, often taking as prisoners those aboard the intercepted craft.

In April 1966, Santon assisted in the rescue of the crew of the wrecked Panamanian freighter Carina. By the time the Indonesian confrontation policy ended in August 1966, Santon had steamed . Following the withdrawal of Commonwealth ships from the anti-infiltration patrols, the RNZN crew took her back to England, where she paid off in reserve at Portsmouth in November 1966.

Argentina
The ship was subsequently sold to Argentina and renamed Chubut (M3). She was decommissioned in 1997.

See also
Minesweepers of the Royal New Zealand Navy

References

Notes

Bibliography 
 McDougall, R J (1989) New Zealand Naval Vessels. pp. 83–84. Government Printing Office. 
 Wright, Gerry (2006) A Kiwi on our Funnel: The story of HMNZ ships Hickleton and Santon, Zenith Print and Design. 

Ships built in Portsmouth
1955 ships
Cold War minesweepers of the United Kingdom
Ton-class minesweepers of the Royal New Zealand Navy
Military history of New Zealand